Big Trout Lake Airport  is located  southwest of Kitchenuhmaykoosib Inninuwug (formerly known as Big Trout Lake), Ontario, Canada.

There is a terminal building at the airport and surrounded by pre-fabricated steel structures. Manual air stairs and baggage carts are used to serve aircraft.

Airlines and destinations

References

External links

Certified airports in Kenora District